Mont Sainte-Odile ( or Ottilienberg; called Allitona in the 8th century) is a 764-metre-high peak in the Vosges Mountains in Alsace in France, immediately west of Barr. The mountain is named after Saint Odile. It has a monastery/convent at its top called the Hohenburg Abbey, and is notable also for its stone fortifications called "the Pagan Wall." In 1992, Air Inter Flight 148 crashed near this area.

History
The mountain and its surroundings contain evidence of Celtic settlements. The mountain enters recorded history during the Roman times; a fortress was supposedly destroyed by the Vandals in 407. In the second half of the 9th century, when Vikings attacked the Low Countries, which had been recently converted to Christianity and were governed from Utrecht, the Utrecht bishops went into exile and stayed for a while in Mont Sainte-Odile.

At least since the 19th century, its beauty has been celebrated and the mountain, with convent and pagan wall, is often included in tourist guides, incl. Baedeker's.

Hohenburg Abbey

The convent is said to have been founded by Adalrich, Duke of Alsace, in honor of his daughter, Saint Odile, about the end of the 7th century, and it is certain that it existed at the time of Charlemagne. Destroyed during the Middle Ages, it was rebuilt by Premonstratensians at the beginning of the 17th century. It was acquired later by the bishop of Strasbourg, who restored the building and the adjoining church in 1853.

A famous manuscript, the Hortus Deliciarum, was compiled in the convent.

The Pagan Wall
The origins and date were disputed for a long time, with some claiming that it was a 3,000-year-old druid construction. Recent research has shown that it dates from the 7th century, about the time that the convent was built. The designation "Pagan" is attributed to Pope Leo IX.

Airbus crash
At 7:20 pm on 20 January 1992, Air Inter Flight 148, an Airbus A320, crashed on a ridge near Mont Sainte-Odile. There were 87 casualties and 9 survivors.

In art and literature
A 2000 poem, "Return to St. Odilienberg, Easter 2000," by the American poet Claire Nicholas White, is inspired by the abbey.

See also
 Places dedicated to Saint Odile
 Niedermunster Abbey, Alsace

References

External links

 Monastery
 

Basilica churches in France
Mountains of Bas-Rhin
Sainte-Odile
Sainte-Odile